Pali is a small village in the Raigad district of Maharashtra, India.

The village is situated on the edge of the river namely 'Pej'. It has a population of around 2000.
The village is surrounded by mountains on three sides and has a pleasant climate with perennial flowing clean water. It has abundant medicinal plants.

References 

Villages in Raigad district